Turney is an Anglo-Norman surname, originally meaning from Tournai, Tornay or Tourny, all three of which are in Normandy, modern-day Belgium and France.

An early recorded Turney was Richard de Turney, named in the Hundred Rolls of Buckinghamshire, England in 1273.

Notables of this name
 Cliff Turney (1932–2005), Australian academic
 Edwin Turney (1929–2008), American businessman
 Faye Turney, Royal Navy sailor
 Hopkins L. Turney (1797–1857), American politician
 Jacob Turney (1825–1891), American politician
 Peter Turney (1827–1903), American politician
 Norris Turney (1921–2001), American jazz flautist and saxophonist
 Joseph Turney (1825–1892), American politician
 Thomas Turney (1800–1887), English cricketer
 Chris Turney (born 1973), English professor

References

Anglo-Norman families